Nau Paora Cherrington (5 March 1924 – 26 June 1979) was a New Zealand rugby union player. A wing, Cherrington represented North Auckland at a provincial level, and was a member of the New Zealand national side, the All Blacks, from 1950 to 1951. He played seven matches for the All Blacks including one international.

References

1924 births
1979 deaths
People from the Northland Region
New Zealand rugby union players
New Zealand international rugby union players
Northland rugby union players
Māori All Blacks players
Rugby union wings
People educated at Bay of Islands College
Rugby union players from the Northland Region